Wasafi Classic Baby (WCB) is a Tanzania-based record label founded by Tanzanian musician Diamond Platnumz.

Artists 

WCB Wasafi has signed a number of artists from Tanzania who have had success across Africa. Including nominations for BET Awards, MTV Africa Music Awards and AFRIMMA Awards.

Employees 
WCB Wasafi consists of 35 employees, including all artists signed under the label, producers, photographers, artist managers, dancers and the whole management.

References

External links 
 

African record labels
Mass media in Dar es Salaam
Tanzanian record labels